Alberto González (born 22 October 1972) is an Argentine fencer. He competed at the 1992 and 2008 Summer Olympics.

References

External links
 

1972 births
Living people
Argentine male fencers
Argentine foil fencers
Olympic fencers of Argentina
Fencers at the 1992 Summer Olympics
Fencers at the 2008 Summer Olympics
Fencers from Buenos Aires
Pan American Games medalists in fencing
Pan American Games bronze medalists for Argentina
South American Games bronze medalists for Argentina
South American Games medalists in fencing
Fencers at the 1995 Pan American Games
Competitors at the 2010 South American Games
20th-century Argentine people